Walter Scott Butler (July 22, 1823 – May 3, 1913) was a political figure in New Brunswick. He represented Queen's County in the Legislative Assembly of New Brunswick from 1867 to 1870 and from 1872 to 1882.

He was born and educated at Grand Lake in Queen's County, the son of James Butler, the son of an Irish immigrant, and Mary Smith, the daughter of a United Empire Loyalist. In 1854, he married Janet Anne Sowers. He was a justice of the peace. Butler was elected to the legislative assembly in an 1867 by-election held after John Ferris was elected to the House of Commons. He was defeated in the 1870 general election but elected in an 1872 by-election held after Gideon D. Bailey resigned his seat.

References 
The Canadian parliamentary companion for 1876 HJ Morgan

External links 
 New Brunswick political biographies,  Irish Canadian Cultural Association of New Brunswick

1823 births
1913 deaths
Members of the Legislative Assembly of New Brunswick
Canadian people of Irish descent